The Gentleman Without a Residence is a 1934 Austrian comedy film directed by E. W. Emo and starring Paul Hörbiger, Hilde von Stolz, and Hermann Thimig. The film's sets were designed by the art director Julius von Borsody.

The film was remade in Britain three years later as Who's Your Lady Friend?.

Cast
Karin Evans as Mary Tired
Lizzi Holzschuh as Ellinor Gray
Paul Hörbiger as Professor Mangold
Adele Sandrock as Mrs. Sommer
Leo Slezak as Kreindl
Hermann Thimig as Fred Reigersheim
Hilde von Stolz as Mrs. Mangold
Hanna Waag as Mimi

References

External links

1934 comedy films
Austrian comedy films
Films directed by E. W. Emo
Austrian films based on plays
Sound film remakes of silent films
Remakes of Austrian films
Austrian black-and-white films
Films scored by Robert Stolz